River Lady is a 1948 American lumberjack Western film directed by George Sherman and starring Yvonne De Carlo and Dan Duryea. It was filmed on the Universal Studios Backlot.

Plot
In the 1870s, in a logging town on the Mississippi River, a conflict exists between the people of a mill town and the lumberjacks who work downriver. Romance and deceit are catalyzed by the arrival of the gambling riverboat, River Lady, owned by a beautiful woman called Sequin.

Bauvais, a representative of the local lumber syndicate and Sequin's business partner, is trying to convince H.L. Morrison, the mill owner, to sell his business. Morrison refuses, and Sequin eventually buys part of the struggling business in order to provide a reputable job for her boyfriend, Dan Corrigan, a lumberjack.

Dan eventually takes the job and he and Sequin become engaged. But, when Dan discovers that Sequin manipulated Morrison into giving him the job, he gets drunk and marries Stephanie, Morrison's daughter. Sparks fly between Morrison's business and Sequin's syndicate instigated by a vengeful Dan.

In the following battle, Bauvais is killed and Dan is shot. After the battle, Sequin visits a healing Dan and asks to get back together (Dan and Stephanie are separated). Dan tells Sequin he has actually fallen in love with his wife and wants to stay with her. On her way out of town forever, Sequin tells Stephanie that Dan wants her thereby reuniting the couple.

Cast
 Yvonne De Carlo as Sequin
 Dan Duryea as Beauvais
 Rod Cameron as Dan Corrigan
 Helena Carter as Stephanie Morrison
 Lloyd Gough as Mike Riley
 Florence Bates as Ma Dunnegan
 John McIntire as H.L. Morrison
 Jack Lambert as Swede
 Esther Somers as Mrs. Morrison
 Anita Turner as Esther
 Edmund Cobb as Rider
 Dewey Robinson as Bouncer
 Eddy Waller as Hewitt
 Milton Kibbee as Limpy
 Billy Wayne as Dealer

Production
The film was based on a novel by  Houston Branch and Frank Waters. Film rights were bought by Universal in March 1941 for a reported $50,000 plus 10 cents for every copy sold over 70,000. The sale was done even before the novel had been written, simply on the strength of its synopsis. The rights were purchased for the Frank Lloyd production unit at Universal, and the film was not able to be made until three months after publication of the novel. Lloyd wanted to make it with Loretta Young.

The novel was published in 1942, the New York Times calling it a "first rate story with no apparent marks of collaboration on it."

When Lloyd left the studio, Universal kept rights to the novel. In 1946 the project was re-activated when it was assigned to producing-writing team of Michael Fessier and Ernest Pagano. They said the stars would be Yvonne de Carlo and Rod Cameron, who had just appeared in Fessier-Pagano's Frontier Gal (1945).

The Hollywood Reporter reported that Ann Blyth was originally cast in River Lady, probably as "Stephanie Morrison", Helena Carter's character. DeCarlo and Duryea had previously appeared together in the Universal film Black Bart, also directed by Sherman. According to Universal press materials, the boat used in River Lady was originally built in 1929 for the silent version of Show Boat. Filming started April 1947. Shot in Technicolor the film was one of Universal's most expensive productions of the year.

Although set in 1870s Minnesota, the film mentions dynamite several times, and one character is shown using it. Dynamite was not invented  until 1867.

Reception
Filmink magazine thought the best thing about the movie was Carter who played her part "with a twinkle in her eye, lively, full of spark and clearly intelligent… a good girl who wouldn’t mind being "bad" for the right guy. She was no shy, retiring violet – she goes after Cameron actively, in part because it's a rebellious act and she's clearly sexually attracted to him – but she's no dummy either."

Universal announced they would team Duryea and de Carlo in a third film, Christmas Eve at Pilot Butte but it was never made.

References

External links
 

River Lady at BFI

1948 Western (genre) films
1948 films
Films directed by George Sherman
Films set in forests
Films about lumberjacks
American Western (genre) films
Films scored by Paul Sawtell
1940s American films